Sir William de Abernethy, 2nd Baron of Saltoun was a 13th-14th century Scottish baron and noble.

William was the son of William Abernethy, 1st Baron of Saltoun. He swore fealty to King Edward I of England at Birgham in 1290 and again at Berwick in 1296. He was a signatory of the Declaration of Arbroath in 1320.

Family and issue
William is known to have had the following known issue:
William (d.1333)

Citations

References
Crawford, George; "The Peerage of Scotland: Containing an Historical and Genealogical Account of the Nobility of that Kingdom: Collected from the Publick Records of the Nation, the Charters and Other Writings of the Nobility, and from the Most Approved Histories" (1716).

Year of birth unknown
Year of death unknown
Medieval Scottish knights
13th-century Scottish people
14th-century Scottish people
Signatories to the Declaration of Arbroath
Scottish feudal barons